Yes, Bulgaria!, is a Bulgarian political party, founded in January 2017 by former Minister of Justice Hristo Ivanov. Yes, Bulgaria! is part of a coalition with Democrats for a Strong Bulgaria and The Greens called Democratic Bulgaria.

History
The party was founded on 7 January 2017, by Hristo Ivanov, who served as Deputy Prime Minister and Minister of Justice in the caretaker Bliznashki Cabinet from 6 August 2014 until 7 November 2014. He then served as Minister of Justice in the Second Borisov Cabinet from 7 November 2014 until his resignation on 9 December 2015, submitted in protest of failed attempts at judicial reform. At its first meeting, Ivanov outlined the party's three main priorities – "to ensure the rule of law and efficient and accessible justice; to accelerate the pace of growth of the country; and the fight against systemic poverty and for raising the standards of living."

According to the Sofia Globe, "Ivanov did something few Bulgarian politicians have done before him: He stood up for his principles."

On 11 January 2017, Ivanov was elected as the party's chairman, together with an Executive Council of 13 parliamentary deputies. Two days later Yes, Bulgaria! submitted their registration documents for the upcoming parliamentary elections at the end of March. In the following weeks, several political formations approached the new party in order to form a possible coalition for the elections, including The Greens, DEOS and the Bulgaria for Citizens Movement. Radan Kanev's Democrats for a Strong Bulgaria, which had previously split from the Reformist Bloc in November 2016, offered to unite with Ivanov's party. In response, Yes, Bulgaria! announced they will attempt to run independently, with Ivanov saying that “it is fair to establish a long-term connection with the voter, to have our own image," thus rejecting the offer from Kanev's now re-branded 'New Republic' coalition.

On 30 January, the Sofia Municipal Court approved the registration of Yes, Bulgaria! as a political party, but three subsequent official complaints against that decision meant the leadership was forced to look for a possible coalition in order to make the deadline for registration. On February 8, Hristo Ivanov announced that an agreement to form a coalition between Yes, Bulgaria!, The Greens and DEOS had been reached, and registration would be possible after the collection of over 20,000 signatures in one day. All three complaints were later withdrawn, and despite further appeals to the Central Electoral Commission, the coalition was cleared for participation on February 15.

According to Novinite, "The Greens are Bulgaria's most active environmentalist party, while DEOS is a liberal organization focusing on the 'rule of law', active civic participation, and minorities."

At the 2017 elections, Yes, Bulgaria won a total of 101,217 votes, or 2.96% of all votes cast, leaving it as the 7th largest formation, but without parliamentary representation. In Sofia's three constituencies, the party gained a total of 7.77% of all votes cast, coming in at 4th place, less than 1,000 votes behind 3rd placed United Patriots. In total, more than 70,000 votes (almost 70%) came from Sofia, Plovdiv, and Varna, as well as from Bulgarians abroad.

On 30 March 2020, during the COVID-19 pandemic in the country, the Sofia City Council members from Democratic Bulgaria, a coalition Yes, Bulgaria is part of, proposed a package of measures in defense of local economy. Those included ten-fold tax cut for landlords for leasing an apartment, rent-free period for businesses renting municipal property for the duration of the national emergency, and reorganization of Sofia public transport in view of the reduced passenger flow.

Hristo Ivanov and the entire party leadership announced on 15 November their resignation following the DB coalition's poor results in the 14 November elections. He was re-elected as leader in January 2022.

Founders 
Founders of the party included “intellectuals, entrepreneurs, artists and many others, who had "intolerance" for corruption and poverty. Some of the party's founders included Dr. Boryana Museva (associate professor of law at Sofia University), economist Vera Asenova, former tennis player Manuela Maleeva, and associate law professor Kristian Takov (until his death in 2017).

One notable member of Yes, Bulgaria is activist Georgi Iliev. He “was one of the organizers of protests during the Peevski scandal the Socialist-led government caused” in 2013.

Political views

In its founding declaration, the party featured seven major principles – personal freedoms and human rights, justice via rule of law, security through democracy and strong institutions, serving the public interest, creation of wealth through entrepreneurship and free enterprise, social solidarity, as well as pluralism and freedom of public debate. The document also outlined the party's 11 major goals. These included judicial, regulatory and media reforms, anti-corruption measures, increased economic growth, a focus on transparent administration and e-governance, higher education standards, civic engagement, energy independence and preservation of the country's national resources, as well as a completion of its integration into the European Union structures – full membership in the Eurozone, Schengen and the banking union.

Yes, Bulgaria's leader Hristo Ivanov has been particularly vocal about the necessity for reform in Bulgaria's justice system. He has raised concern about the excessive powers and lack of accountability of Bulgaria's General Prosecutor Sotir Tsatsarov. He has emphasized that Bulgaria's Prosecution has a Stalinist model which compromises the rule of law. He has repeatedly asked for Sotir Tsatsarov's resignation as the Prosecution was allegedly involved in major corruption scandals.

Elections
Yes, Bulgaria received 101,177 votes in the 2017 parliamentary elections, which was 2.96% of the vote. The party did not reach the four percent electoral threshold required to win seats in Parliament.

Parliamentary elections results

European Parliament elections results

Notes

References

External links
Official website

Political parties established in 2017
2017 establishments in Bulgaria
Liberal parties in Bulgaria
Pro-European political parties in Bulgaria